Leo Ouni (né Mäkelä; born 16 September 1988) is a Finnish curler. He competed at the 2015 Ford World Men's Curling Championship in Halifax, Nova Scotia, Canada, as alternate for the Finnish national curling team.

References

External links
 

1988 births
Living people
Finnish male curlers
21st-century Finnish people